Pachypoessa is a monotypic genus of jumping spiders containing the single species, Pachypoessa lacertosa. It was first described by Eugène Louis Simon in 1902, and is only found in Africa.

References

Monotypic Salticidae genera
Salticidae
Spiders of Africa